The 2007–08 Virginia Cavaliers men's basketball team is an NCAA Division I college basketball team competing in the Atlantic Coast Conference. The Cavaliers sought to continue their 2006–07 season success in which they finished tied for first place in the conference with North Carolina (see 2006–07 Atlantic Coast Conference men's basketball season).

The Cavaliers were picked to finish 5th place for the 2007–2008 season in the ACC Preseason Poll. Senior Sean Singletary was named to the five-member preseason All-ACC team.

Players

Roster

Recruits 
The Virginia Cavalier 2007 recruiting class consisted of 4 signed players.  The class is headlined by consensus four star shooting guard, Jeff Jones.

Watch list 
 Sean Singletary
 Pre-season All American (CBS Sportsline, Collegehoops.net, CollegeInsider.com)
 Wooden Award Candidate
 Naismith Award Candidate
 Bob Cousy Award Candidate
 Pre-season All Atlantic Coast Conference

Schedule and results

|-
!colspan=9 style="background:#00214e; color:#f56d22;"| Non-conference regular season

|-
!colspan=9 style="background:#00214e; color:#f56d22;"| Conference regular season

|-
!colspan=9 style="background:#00214e; color:#f56d22;"| ACC Tournament

|-
!colspan=9 style="background:#00214e; color:#f56d22;"| College Basketball Invitational

References

Virginia Cavaliers men's basketball seasons
Virginia
Virginia
2007 in sports in Virginia
2008 in sports in Virginia